Gelse is a village in Zala County, Hungary. As of 2014 the population is 1110. Most people are Roman Catholic.

References

External links 
 Street map 

Populated places in Zala County